The year 2009 is the seventh year in the history of Jungle Fight, a mixed martial arts promotion based in Brazil. In 2009 Jungle Fight held 5 events beginning with, Jungle Fight 12: Warriors 2.

Events list

Jungle Fight 12: Warriors 2

Jungle Fight 12: Warriors 2 was an event held on March 21, 2009 at The Team Nogueira Training Center in Rio de Janeiro, Brazil.

Results

Jungle Fight 13: Qualifying Fortaleza

Jungle Fight 13: Qualifying Fortaleza was an event held on March 28, 2009 at The Fighter Sport Academy in Fortaleza, Brazil.

Results

Jungle Fight 14: Ceará

Jungle Fight 14: Ceará was an event held on May 9, 2009 at The Paulo Sarasate Gymnasium in Fortaleza, Brazil.

Results

Jungle Fight 15

Jungle Fight 15 was an event held on September 19, 2009 at The Pacaembu Gymnasium in São Paulo, Brazil.

Results

Jungle Fight 16

Jungle Fight 16 was an event held on October 17, 2009 at The Maracanãzinho Gymnasium in Rio de Janeiro, Brazil.

Results

See also 
 Jungle Fight

References

2009 in mixed martial arts
Jungle Fight events